Cassandane or Cassandana (died 538 BC) was an Achaemenian shahbanu as the wife of Cyrus the Great.

She was a daughter of Pharnaspes. She had four children with Cyrus: Cambyses II, who succeeded his father and conquered Egypt; Smerdis (Bardiya), who also reigned as the king of Persia for a short time; a daughter named Atossa, who later wed Darius the Great; and another daughter named Roxana.

Her daughter Atossa later played an important role in the Achaemenid royal family, as she married Darius the Great and bore him the next Achaemenid king, Xerxes I.

When Cassandane died, all the nations of Cyrus' Persian empire observed "a great mourning". This is reported by Herodotus. According to a report in the chronicle of Nabonidus, there was a public mourning after her death in Babylonia lasting for six days.  Cassandane  reportedly stated that it was more bitter to leave Cyrus's side than to die. 
Cyrus demanded his kingdom mourn her death:  according to the Nabonidus Chronicle, this lasted six days (identified as 21–26 March 538 BC). According to a suggestion by M. Boyce, Cassandane's tomb is located at Pasargadae.

Notes

Bibliography

 
 

6th-century BC women
Queens of the Achaemenid Empire
6th-century BC Iranian people